Armais Vaganovich Sayadov (born 18 October 1937) is an Armenian-Ukrainian retired flyweight Greco-Roman wrestler from Azerbaijan. He competed for the Soviet Union at the 1964 Summer Olympics, but was eliminated after three bouts. Sayadov won the world title in 1961 and placed second at the 1966 European Champsionships. Domestically he won the Soviet title in 1958, 1961, 1963 and 1965. His elder brother Georgy competed in freestyle wrestling at the 1952 Olympics. 

Armais was born to the Armenian wrestler Vagan Sayadyan, who changed his last name to Sayadov to blend in Azerbaijan. Besides Georgy, Armais had three other brothers. Initially both Georgy and Armais competed as flyweights in freestyle wrestler, but Armais later moved to Greco-Roman wrestling to avoid competing against his brother. After retiring from competitions he had a long career as a coach and referee. In 1990, during the Baku pogrom, he fled to Kyiv, Ukraine.

References

1937 births
Living people
Olympic wrestlers of the Soviet Union
Wrestlers at the 1964 Summer Olympics
Sportspeople from Baku
Armenian wrestlers